is the mainstream lay organization affiliated with the Nichiren Shōshū. It traces its origins to three martyr disciples who were arrowed and later beheaded in the Atsuhara persecutions and a more recent tradition of family lineages between 1726 and 1829 who have historically protected the Dai-Gohonzon over the centuries.

Based on the word Hokke Shu inscribed on the Dai Gohonzon, another translation is "Lotus believers". As part of its official doctrine, the same sect teaches that Nichiren designated this term for his own followers during his lifetime.

The Hokkekō lay memberships are headed by local leaders called Koto, and are not affiliated with any political organization. Hokkekō members meet in residential homes and hold a local chapter each year to plan their Tozan religious pilgrimages to the Taisekiji temple.

Prior to 27 December 1997, lay members of the Sōka Gakkai were considered by Nichiren Shōshū to be equal to Hokkekō members, entitled to participate in meetings and see the Dai-Gohonzon, allowing a 7 year span before officially ending their sectarian membership, which went into effect on 1 December 1997. The current Dai-Koto Chairperson for the Hokkekō Federation is Mr. Koichiro Hoshino.

History  

Before the current lay association established with Nichiren Shōshū members, the Hokkekō traces its origins to the Atsuhara persecutions, who were mostly lower class peasants in Japanese feudal society. Seventeen believers were whipped and dragged to their death, while three farmers, Jin-shirou, Yagoro and Yarou-Kuro, were tied to a wooden post and killed by arrows after not renouncing the Lotus Sūtra in favour of the Pure Land teachings.

In later references, temple congregations known as Hokkekō or  date back to at least the 13th century. Nichiren Daishōnin (1222-1282), the founder of Nichiren Shōshū, also referred collectively to his lay followers as Hokke—shū in the dedication written on the Dai-Gohonzon, the school's object of veneration, inscribed on 12 October 1279.

Nichiren Shōshū attributes the appellation Hokkekō to this usage by Nichiren Daishōnin.  Hokkekō is the name given to Nichiren Daishōnin's believers who died at the Atsuhara persecution and its present living family descendants. They are affiliated with the head temple at Taiseki-ji in Japan.

Organization

In addition to being what congregations of Nichiren Shōshū temples (close to 700 in Japan and 20 in other countries) have traditionally called themselves, Hokkekō is also used loosely in reference to all temple congregations (local Hokkekō chapters) collectively. When used this way, it can be understood to mean the national Hokkekō umbrella organization in Japan and Hokkekō groups that encompass the congregations of Nichiren Shōshū temples outside Japan.

The Japanese umbrella organization, officially called the Hokkekō Rengō Kai (Hokkekō Federation), is related to Japanese Buddhism and was incorporated under Japanese law in July 1962. Its headquarters are located at Hodo-in temple Toshima Tōkyō, Japan, and it maintains a chapter at each local temple.

Hokkekō groups tend to be organized fairly loosely and are generally unregimented. Whereas some members are very active in temple-based propagation and other activities, others come only for a monthly service called o-kō (or, more formally, "meeting to show gratitude to the Buddha"), the annual Oeshiki ceremony on the anniversary of Nichiren Daishōnin's passing, and other temple events.

Though Nichiren Shōshū still considered individual Sōka Gakkai members to be lay followers until a rule change in September 1997, most members mistakenly believed that they had been excommunicated along with the Sōka Gakkai organization and its executive leaders.

Hokkekō is not affiliated with any political organization. (The former Dai-Koto was Mr. Kisoji Yanagisawa.) The current Dai-Koto of the Hokkekō Federation is Mr. Koichiro Hoshino. The present Vice-Chairman is Mr. Hiroo Sekino.

See also
Nichiren Shōshū
Nichiren Buddhism

Notes

Nichiren Buddhism